Wings On My Feet is the sixth solo album by Denny Laine.

Track listing
All tracks composed by Denny Laine.

Side one
 "Wings on My Feet" 3.34
 "Kick the Ball" 3.03
 "Portrait" 3.27
 "Castle in the Air" 3.05
 "Roll the Dice" 3.57
 "Lucy Lullaby" 4.13

Side two
 "No Sleep" 3.45
 "Tao Princess" 3.38
 "It's Never Too Late" 3.16
 "Caribbean Sun" 3.26
 "Blushing Bride" 4.06
 "Spacetrain" 4.11

Personnel
Denny Laine: Guitar & Vocals
Rick Wakeman: Keyboards
Chris Slade: Drums
Earl Lewis: Bass
Tracy Ackerman: Backing Vocals
Jackie Rawe: Backing Vocals

Production notes
Produced by Denny Laine
Engineered by Ray Hedges and Sean Lynch
Recorded at Studio House, Wraysbury, Middlesex

References

1987 albums
Denny Laine albums